Ernest Henry Norgbey is a Ghanaian politician and member of the Seventh Parliament of the Fourth Republic of Ghana representing the Ashaiman Constituency in the Greater Accra Region on the ticket of the National Democratic Congress.

Early life and education 
Norgbey was born in Ho-Ziavi in the Volta Region of Ghana. Norgbey studied at the Chartered Institute of Purchasing and Supply where he received a diploma. He also received a diploma at the International School of Aviation. He graduated in 2003 with an MSC in Supply Chain Management from Coventry University in the UK. Norgbey graduated from University of Professional Studies, Accra, in 2011 with a BBA. In 2014, he became a chartered member of the Supply Chain Management, UK, and acquired a Postgraduate Certificate in Public Procurement Law and Policy at the University of Nottingham, UK, in 2015.

Career 

Norgbey worked as a teacher at Happy Home Basic School in 2006-2009 and later became the procurement officer at NADMO.

Politics 
In 2015 he contested and won the NDC parliamentary primaries for Ashiaman Constituency in the Greater Accra Region of Ghana. He won this parliamentary seat during the 2016 Ghanaian general elections.

Personal life 
Norgbey is married with one child. Norgbey is a Christian.

References

Ghanaian MPs 2017–2021
1980 births
Living people
National Democratic Congress (Ghana) politicians
University of Professional Studies alumni
Ghanaian MPs 2021–2025